The Soldiers is a South Korean military-themed reality show broadcast on SBS. The show seeks to find the "best special forces operator in the world," beginning with selecting the best Korean special forces representatives through a series of missions. Twenty male South Korean reservists who served in various special forces units of the Republic of Korea Armed Forces compete on the show. The cast also includes four former special forces operators from the United Kingdom, Sweden, United States and South Korea who serve as mentors and later team leaders to the participants.

The show aired every Friday at 23:10 (KST) from November 19, 2021, to January 28, 2022. Longer, uncut versions of each episode were released the following Wednesday at 18:00 (KST) on the YouTube channel "뉴띵 NDD."

In the first episode, the show is explained as a three-season project:

 Season 1: select the best team of South Korean special forces reservists
 Season 2: compete with national representative teams across Asia-Pacific
 Season 3: find the strongest team across the globe

The survival program has been compared by media and viewers to Steel Troops, which has a similar special forces premise and aired its first season half a year earlier. In response to the comparison, show host Kim Sang-joong said that "[The Soldiers] is more upgraded and entertaining, with more intense missions." Show producer Gi Sang-soo also asserted that The Soldiers is "the first television program of its kind," with its global focus bearing the largest distinction.

Cast

Host and mentors

Participants

List of episodes 

Mission results 
The show began with an individual competition, spanning episodes 1 to 3, to assess and rank the 20 participants. At the end of this stage, 4 participants were eliminated. The mentors then collectively ranked the remaining 16 participants prior to selecting their desired team members. However, the top 4 ranked participants were given the right to choose which mentor's team to join instead. From the second half of episode 3, the show then proceeded with the main team competition. 
In the tables below,

 results in  indicate a penalty given, such as an extra mission or becoming a candidate for elimination.
 results in  indicate either gaining a mission benefit or surviving an elimination round.

Notes

References

External links 
 Official website

Seoul Broadcasting System original programming
South Korean television shows
2021 South Korean television series debuts
South Korean military television series